Saxby railway station was a station serving the villages of Saxby and Freeby, Leicestershire. It was located between the two villages.

Access
The older station was accessed along a turning from the B676 road, now known as Old Station Drive, whereas the newer station building was accessed off the Saxby to Stapleford road on the right before the railway bridge. Inter platform access on the newer station was via three sets of stairs to the road bridge.

History

The station at Saxby opened on 1 February 1849, and was at the north end of a tight curve around a corner of Stapleford Park.
The curve was considered unsuitable for express trains running between Kettering and Nottingham via the Manton loop, so an easier curve was built in 1892 together with a new Saxby station, which opened on 28 August 1892. The original station on a stub of the original line continued in use for goods.

Saxby became a junction when the Midland and Great Northern Joint Railway (M&GN) opened on 1 May 1894.

The M&GN line closed to passengers after the last train on 28 February 1959, although the section between Saxby and  remained open for goods trains.

The station closed on 6 February 1961. The last parts of the new station were completely demolished in late 2014, whereas the old station remains as a private house.

Routes

References

 Track plans and Photographs

Former Midland Railway stations
Disused railway stations in Leicestershire
Railway stations in Great Britain opened in 1849
Railway stations in Great Britain closed in 1961
1849 establishments in England